Sedan is a rural town in South Australia. It is located about 100 kilometres east of Adelaide and about 20 kilometres west of the Murray River.  It is located on the dry eastern side of the Mount Lofty Ranges.

Overview
Sedan used to be the terminus of the South Australian Railways' Sedan line, which opened on 13 October 1919, and was curtailed to Cambrai in 1964.

Sedan is at the junction of the Stott Highway which connects the Barossa Valley on the west to the River Murray and Riverland on the east, and Halfway House Road which provides a north–south heavy vehicle route between the Sturt Highway and Princes Highway on the plains to the east of the Mount Lofty Ranges.

Surrounded by dry-stone walls built by early settlers, the historic town of Sedan is home to many 19th century buildings that are in excellent condition.

The Sedan Heritage Trail – available from the Sedan Hotel – is a good way to discover the town. Once a busy railway town, complete with steam flour mill and agricultural machinery factory, Sedan was settled in the 1850s by German settlers. The town was originally a private subdivision of Section 52, and named for the Battle of Sedan in the Franco-Prussian War.

When the amalgamated District Council of Keyneton and Swan Reach was established in 1933, Sedan was chosen to be the seat of council. Later the council name was changed to reflect the seat, becoming the District Council of Sedan.

Pine Hut Creek
Pine Hut Creek and Pine Hut Plain are historic names for areas to the south of the township in the locality of Sedan. The creek flows from the eastern side of the Mount Lofty Ranges to the Murray River. There was once a Congregational Church school which closed in 1880 and government school from 1900 to 1910. There is a small cemetery no longer used.

References

External links

Towns in South Australia